Manoj K. Bharathi (born 11 September 1976 as Manoj Bharathiraja) is an Indian actor. He is most noted as the son of director Bharathiraja. Manoj made his acting debut with Taj Mahal in 1999.
He has been the part of few Tamil movies like Samudhiram (2001), Kadal Pookkal (2001), Varushamellam Vasantham (2002), Pallavan (2003), Eera Nilam (2003), Annakodi (2013) and Baby (2015).

Before becoming an actor in the Tamil film industry, Manoj worked as an assistant director. He worked as an assistant to his father in films such as Final Cut of Director (2016).

Career
Before becoming an actor in the Tamil film industry, Manoj worked as an assistant actor. He studied theatre arts at the University of South Florida.

He made his acting debut in the 1999 Tamil film Taj Mahal, directed by his father, with himself alongside Riya Sen, who was making her debut as well. Subsequently, Manoj appeared in films such as Samuthiram, alongside Sarath Kumar and Murali and in Kadal Pookkal, directed by his father, sharing screen space with Murali once again. The latter became a box office failure, But received much critical acclaim for which Bharathiraja was awarded the National Film Award for Best Screenplay. He then enacted the lead role in Saran's Alli Arjuna, alongside Richa Pallod, before starring in the low budget productions Varushamellam Vasantham and Pallavan, which failed to achieve commercial success. Later, he starred in Sathyaraj's Maha Nadigan in a cameo role and did a negative role in the unreleased Telugu film Lemon.

He worked as an assistant to his father in films such as Final Cut of Director and noted filmmaker Mani Ratnam in Bombay. From 2008 til 2010, he worked as an assistant to director S. Shankar in his magnum opus Enthiran. Since 2007, it has been reported that Manoj was set to remake his father's Sigappu Rojakkal, but the film still remains in pre-production. In 2012, his father signed him up to replace Ameer in his production Annakodiyum Kodiveeranum, as an antagonist, thus marking a return to films after a seven-year sabbatical.

Personal life
On 19 November 2006, Manoj married his longtime friend actress Nandana, who has appeared in Tamil films such as ABCD and Success. Nandhana was his co-star in the film Saadhuriyan. The marriage was held at Ashirwad Marriage Hall at Kozhikode, Kerala, homeplace of Nandhana, whilst a grand reception took place on 1 December 2006 at Mayor Ramanathan Chettiar Hall in Chennai, Tamil Nadu. The couple has 2 daughters, Arthika and Mathivadani.

Filmography

References

External links
 

1974 births
Living people
Tamil actors
Tamil male actors
Male actors from Tamil Nadu
People from Theni district
University of South Florida alumni